Our Lady of Banneux, or Our Lady of the Poor, is the sobriquet given to the apparition of the Virgin Mary to Mariette Beco, an adolescent girl living in Banneux, Liège Province, Belgium. Between 15 January and 2 March 1933 Beco told her family and parish priest of seeing a Lady in white who declared herself to be the "Virgin of the Poor", saying I come to relieve suffering and Believe in me and I will believe in you.

The apparitions
The Lady in White reportedly declared she was the Virgin of the Poor and said: "Believe in me and I will believe in you."

According to Mariette, she first saw the Blessed Virgin on the evening of Sunday 16 January 1933, as she was looking out the kitchen window. A woman in white stood in the garden and called to her to come out, but her mother would not let her. She is described as a young lady in the yard smiling at her. The woman was bent slightly forward and wearing a long white gown with a blue sash, and a transparent white veil. Three days later the woman in white reappeared and told Mariette she was "Our Lady of the Poor". The lady appeared eight times in all, the last on 2 March 1933.

In one of these visions, Mariette said the Lady asked her to plunge (push) her hands into a small spring [poussez vos mains dans l'eau], telling her the spring was for healing and "for all nations". Over time the site drew pilgrims. Today, the small spring yields about 2,000 gallons of water a day with many reports of miraculous healings.

Mariette, meanwhile, became the object of local derision, with even her grandmother and aunt making fun of her. Boys followed her around, calling her "Bernadette", kneeling and asking for her blessing. Her claims were subject to an official investigation from 1935 to 1937 by an episcopal commission. The evidence collected was submitted to Rome for further analysis. Meanwhile, a hospital was built in 1938.

In May 1942, Bishop Kerkhofs of Belgium's Diocese of Liege approved the veneration of Mary under the title of Our Lady of the Poor and approved the apparitions themselves in 1949. Although the Holy See gave the bishop permission to approve the apparition, the Holy See itself did not approve it.

After the apparitions, Mariette decided to remain a private person, married and led a quiet family life. A small chapel stands where the Virgin of the Poor is said to have requested it to be built.

Mariette died on 2 December 2011, at the age of 90. In 2008 she made a final statement about her role in the apparitions: "I was no more than a postman who delivers the mail.  Once this has been done, the postman is of no importance any more".

Veneration
As Our Lady of Banneux she has two titles: Our Lady of the Poor and Queen of Nations. Her feast day under these titles is January 15.

See also

 Our Lady of Beauraing
 Visions of Jesus and Mary

References

External links
 Our Lady of Banneux official website
 YouTube video of Our Lady of Banneux 

Shrines to the Virgin Mary
Marian apparitions
Visions of Jesus and Mary
Roman Catholic shrines in Belgium